Schizothorax nudiventris is a species of ray-finned fish in the genus Schizothorax, from the upper reaches of the Mekong River in China.

References 

Schizothorax
Fish described in 2009